The CN Newmarket Subdivision is a rail line in Ontario operated by Canadian National Railway (CNR). The original route runs northward from just west of Union Station in downtown Toronto, ending just south of North Bay. A short portion between Allandale in Barrie and Longford outside Orillia was lifted in 1996, and the southern section sold off in parts to Metrolinx. Metrolinx operates the southern section as their Barrie line, while CN continues to operate the northern section from Longford to North Bay. The severed northern section was never renamed, despite it no longer running through its namesake town. Access to Toronto is currently via the Bala Subdivision at Washago Junction, a short distance north of the remaining section's southern terminus, which is now used as a spur serving industries. 

The line was originally the Northern Railway of Canada, the first railway to open for commercial business in what was then Upper Canada. It reached Allandale in 1853 and then began construction northwest towards Collingwood and beyond to Meaford. After merging with their competitor, the Hamilton and Northwestern Railway, they built a joint line running northeast out of Barrie toward Orillia, and then on to meet the Canadian Pacific Railway transcontinental lines in North Bay. The Northern was purchased by the Grand Trunk Railway in 1888, whose bankruptcy in 1918 led to the line becoming part of the newly formed CNR in 1923. The northeastern branch became part of the Newmarket Subdivision, with the original line becoming the Meaford Subdivision, which CN sold off in 1998 to the municipalities of Barrie and Collingwood to become the Barrie-Collingwood Railway. CNR continued use of both lines in spite of now having several routes northward, and did not begin closing portions (Collingwood to Meaford) until the 1980s.

The line was used by Via Rail's transcontinental The Canadian, running north from Toronto to Washago at the north end of Lake Couchiching where it switched to the Bala Sub and proceeded to Sudbury. From 1976, the ONR operated the Northlander passenger train service along this line between Toronto and North Bay, albeit often in one direction only to avoid turning the trainset; switching onto their own lines in North Bay to continue on to Cochrane. Beginning in 1982, the line also began to be used by GO Transit for service from Toronto to Bradford, with a brief period of service to Barrie lasting from 1990 to 1993. Barrie did not see GO service again until 2007. 

In 1996, the rails between Barrie and Longford (just south of Washago Junction) were removed, thus ending service to Orillia, severing the line. The Canadian then used the line as far as Snyder Junction with the York Sub just north of the Toronto city limits, and then uses the York Sub to access the Bala Sub and on to Sudbury. The Northlander instead switched to the Bala Sub for its entire run.

In 1996, CN also applied to abandon the entire section from York Sub to Barrie. This section was then purchased by the Ontario government for use by GO Transit. CN retained the section from the York Sub to Union Station, but eventually sold off that section to the newly formed Metrolinx in 2009. This junction has been grade separated and has allowed increased commuter traffic on the line, including 15 minute service and weekend trains.

The northern portion of the original Newmarket Sub between Washago Junction and North Bay is still owned and operated by CN, and is exclusively used for freight traffic travelling between Toronto (from the Bala Sub) and North Bay.   On September 19 2018, CN declared that the section running south of Washago to Longford Mills would be discontinued as part of their 3-year-plan.  On September 21 2019, the Canadian Railway Preservation and Restoration Association (CRPRA) expressed their interest in that section of the Newmarket Sub to operate a local tourism train.  The CN Newmarket Sub hasn't seen a passenger train on its tracks since the last remaining passenger service, the Northlander, which ended service in 2012.

References 

 

Newmarket Subdivision
Rail infrastructure in Simcoe County
Rail infrastructure in the District Municipality of Muskoka
Rail transport in Bracebridge, Ontario
Rail transport in Huntsville, Ontario
Rail infrastructure in Parry Sound District
Rail infrastructure in Nipissing District
Rail infrastructure in North Bay, Ontario